= Plaça Redona =

Plaza in Valencia, Spain

Coordinates: 39.4736°N 0.3766°W

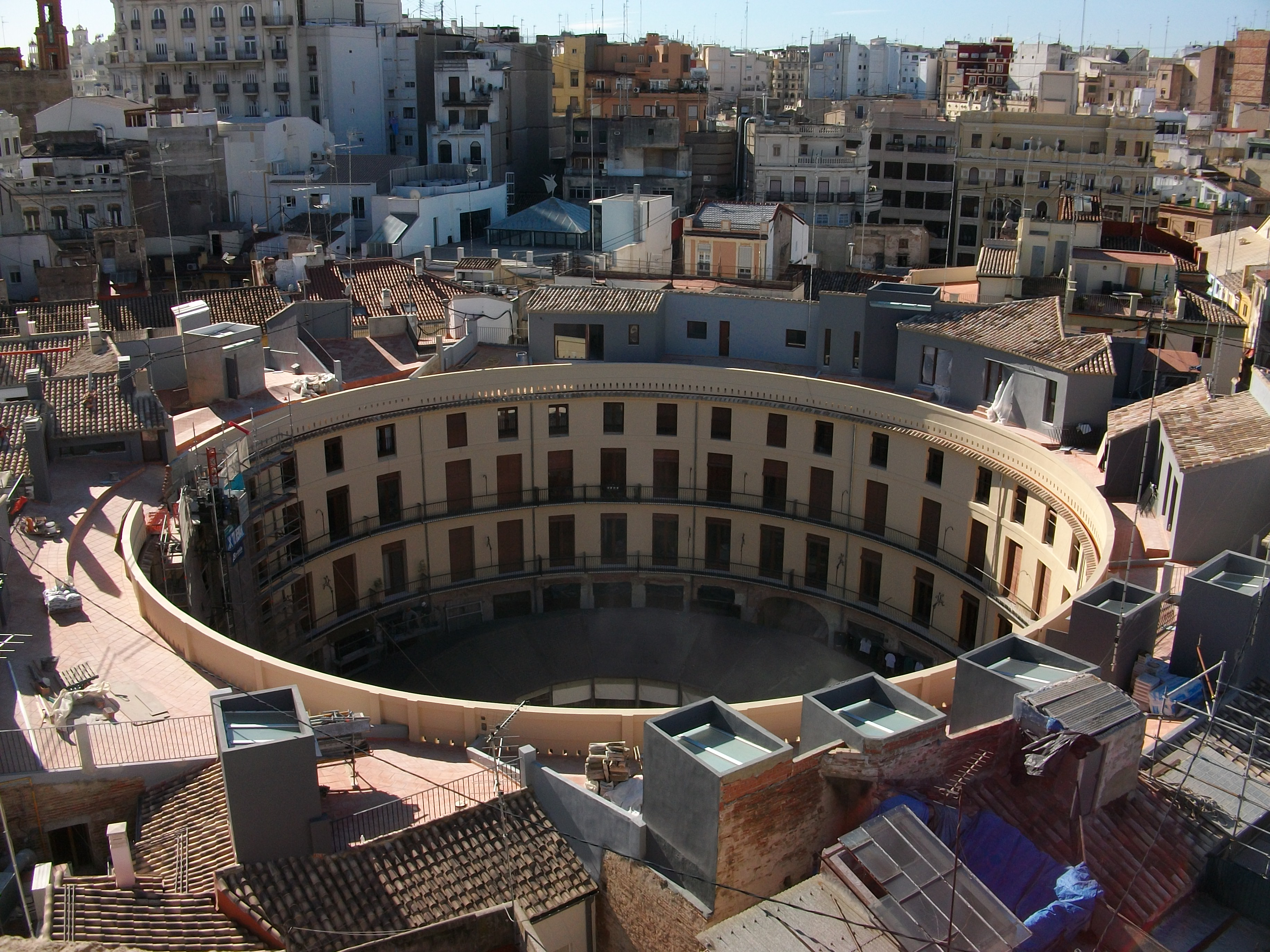
Plaça Redona square seen from the tower of Santa Caterina, Valencia

La Plaça Redona, also called Plaça del Clot is a plaza located in the El Mercat(ca) section of the Ciutat Vella district of Valencia, Spain. It lies in the middle of the triangle formed by three nearby plazas: La Plaça del Mercat ("Market Plaza"), La Plaça de la Reina ("Plaza of the Queen"), and La Plaça de l'Ajuntament ("City Hall Plaza").

Motorized traffic is not allowed

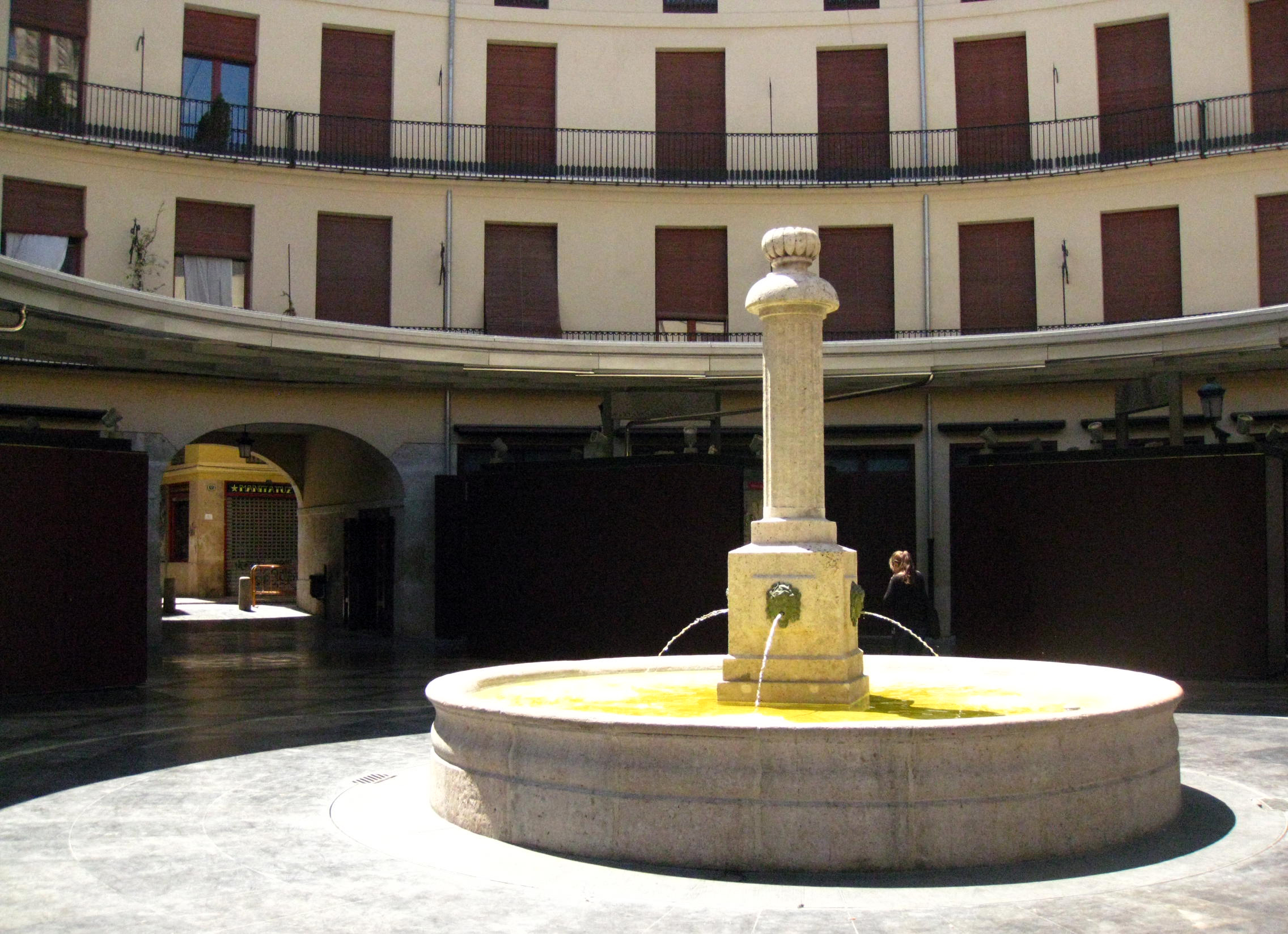
The fountain and one of the accesses to the square

== Design ==
It has a round shape, with an entrance from each cardinal direction. The reduced dimensions of the square make vehicle traffic impossible: it is one of the smallest squares in the city. Its main access is from Carrer de Sant Vicent, where it flows into the Plaza de la Reina, the other entrance to the narrow streets in the immediate area.

The square is surrounded by houses and commercial buildings and therefore the square is invisible from the outside. Houses form a yellow uninterrupted wall that wraps around the plaza and produces an elongated four-story cylinder.

It is only a few steps away from the central market and therefore many people cross between this first and the Plaza de la Reina.

The amenities consist of a high fountain in the center lit by a lamp that is almost the only illumination. Around this fountain is an open space and then a ring of vendor stalls.

The stalls and the deck are painted wood and make a separator between the center, with the lamp, and the ends of the square. On the lower part of the houses that surround the complex are small shops. The plaza forms a series of concentric rings.
